The 2018 Engie Open de Seine-et-Marne was a professional tennis tournament played on indoor hard courts. It was the sixth edition of the tournament and was part of the 2018 ITF Women's Circuit. It took place in Croissy-Beaubourg, France, on 26 March–1 April 2018.

Singles main draw entrants

Seeds 

 1 Rankings as of 19 March 2018.

Other entrants 
The following players received a wildcard into the singles main draw:
  Audrey Albié
  Manon Léonard
  Chloé Paquet
  Jessika Ponchet

The following player received entry using a junior exempt:
  Elena Rybakina

The following players received entry from the qualifying draw:
  Olga Doroshina
  Jesika Malečková
  Karolína Muchová
  Harmony Tan

The following players received entry as Lucky Losers:
  Cristiana Ferrando
  Katarzyna Piter
  Urszula Radwańska

Champions

Singles

 Anna Blinkova def.  Karolína Muchová, walkover

Doubles
 
 Anna Kalinskaya /  Viktória Kužmová def.  Petra Krejsová /  Jesika Malečková, 7–6(7–5), 6–1

External links 
 Official website
 2018 Engie Open de Seine-et-Marne at ITFtennis.com

2018 ITF Women's Circuit
2018 in French tennis
Open de Seine-et-Marne